The 2014 FINA Diving World Series is the eighth edition of FINA Diving World Series. This series consisted of six legs, each hosted in a different country: China, United Arab Emirates, Great Britain, Russia, Canada, and Mexico.

Overview

Schedule 
The series consisted of the following legs:

Overall medal tally

Overall ranking 
Overall ranking is based on the results from the six legs of the series. Divers earned points based on placement at each competition. For individual events, points were counted separately for each person. For synchronized events, points were combined for each country – some countries had different pairs compete at the different legs of the series. Medals were not awarded for overall ranking, but top divers (or countries for synchro) who competed in all six legs earned prize money.

Men 
source: FINA

Women 
source: FINA

Beijing leg 
sources: FINA and Omega Timing

Medal table

Medal summary

Men

Women

Dubai leg 
sources: FINA and Omega Timing

Medal table

Medal summary

Men

Women

London leg 
sources: FINA and Omega Timing

Medal table

Medal summary

Men

Women

Moscow leg 
sources: FINA and Omega Timing

Medal table

Medal summary

Men

Women

Windsor leg 
sources: FINA and Omega Timing

Medal table

Medal summary

Men

Women

Monterrey leg 
sources: FINA and Omega Timing

Medal table

Medal summary

Men

Women

References 

2014 in diving
FINA Diving World Series